The 1922 Banbury by-election was a parliamentary by-election held for the British House of Commons constituency of Banbury on 22 June 1922. The seat had become vacant upon the appointment of the sitting Coalition Liberal MP, Sir R Rhys-Williams, to become Recorder of Cardiff. This was an office of profit under the Crown and in accordance with the constitutional requirements of the day Rhys-Williams was obliged to resign his seat and fight a by-election.

No candidate from any other party came forward to challenge Rhys-Williams however and he was returned unopposed.
Rhys-Williams continued as MP for Banbury until the general election in November 1922 when he stood down from Parliament to concentrate on his judicial responsibilities.

References

See also
1918 Banbury by-election 
List of United Kingdom by-elections
United Kingdom by-election records

1922 elections in the United Kingdom
Unopposed ministerial by-elections to the Parliament of the United Kingdom in English constituencies
1922 in England
By-elections to the Parliament of the United Kingdom in Oxfordshire constituencies
Banbury
20th century in Oxfordshire
June 1922 events